Yakovenko is a surname of Ukrainian origin, derived from the first name Yakov (the Ukrainian equivalent of Jacob or James) and effectively means of Jacob/Jacob's. Notable people with the surname include:

Alexander Yakovenko (disambiguation), multiple people
Dmitri Yakovenko (born 1981), Russian screenwriter and director
Mariya Yakovenko (born 1982), Russian javelin thrower
Natalia Yakovenko (born 1942), Ukrainian historian, Doctor of Historical Sciences
Nikolay Yakovenko (1941–2006), Russian wrestler
Pavlo Yakovenko (born 1964), Ukrainian footballer
Sergei Yakovenko (born 1976), Kazakhstani ice hockey player
Yuriy Yakovenko (born 1993), Ukrainian footballer

See also
 

Ukrainian-language surnames
Patronymic surnames
Surnames from given names